The Haptic phone is a touch phone developed by South Korean mobile phone company Anycall, a division of Samsung Group. Anycall has launched successful brands of the phone, such as Yuna's Haptic, advertised by famous South Korean skater Kim Yuna and the Haptic Amoled.

Samsung mobile phones
Mobile phones introduced in 2008